John Calvin Briggs (August 1, 1920 – August 22, 1998) was an American actor.

He was the son of Mr. and Mrs. Benjamin Katz, and he attended DeWitt Clinton High School in New York. He served in the Marines during World War II. 

Briggs' first theatrical experience came with the Maverick Theatre in Woodstock, New York, but it initially involved no acting. He worked behind the scenes until on-stage opportunities arose. He was known for Joan of Paris (1942), Ladies' Day (1943) and My Forbidden Past (1951).

He was married to Ginger Rogers from January 16, 1943 to September 7, 1949.

He died on August 22, 1998, and was buried at the Gerald B. H. Solomon Saratoga National Cemetery, in Schuylerville.

Filmography

Film

Television

References

External links

20th-century American male actors
American male film actors
1920 births
1998 deaths
Burials at Gerald B. H. Solomon Saratoga National Cemetery
Actors from Schenectady, New York
Military personnel from Schenectady, New York